The Overlanders Way is an Australian road route from Townsville in Queensland to Tennant Creek, Northern Territory. It has been designated by the Queensland Government as a State Strategic Touring Route.

The route
The route is via the Flinders Highway to Cloncurry, and then the Barkly Highway to Tennant Creek.

Outback Queensland website
The tourism organisation "Outback Queensland" has established a website titled "Overlanders Way" that provides some information about each of the following segments: 
 Townsville to Charters Towers (intersection with Gregory Highway (Great Inland Way))
 Charters Towers to Hughenden
 Hughenden to Richmond
 Richmond to Julia Creek
 Julia Creek to Cloncurry (intersections with Landsborough Highway and Burke Developmental Road (Matilda Way))
 Cloncurry to Mount Isa
 Mount Isa to Camooweal

References 

State Strategic Touring Routes in Queensland